Willem Smits (1704 – 1 December 1770) was a Dutch Franciscan orientalist and exegete.

Biography
Smits was born at Kevelaer in the Duchy of Guelders. He entered the Order of Friars Minor at the age of eighteen. As a religious he applied himself to the study of Biblical languages and Sacred Scripture and was appointed lector.

From 1732 to 1744, he published, at Antwerp, several Biblical theses dealing with questions of textual criticism and chronology. In one of these, "Isagoge Romano-Catholica ad textum hebraeum...", he shows that the Latin Vulgate is substantially a faithful translation of the original Hebrew; and in another, "Isagoge Romano-Catholica ad textum graecum vulgo LXX. . .", he states the reasons why the Septuagint is preferable to the actual Hebrew text.

At the request of Cardinal d'Alsace, then Archbishop of Mechelen, Smits undertook the translation of the entire Bible into Dutch. The title is: "Biblia Sacra Vulgatae editionis, versione belgica, notis grammaticalibus, literalibus, criticis, ... elucidata per FF. Minores Recollectes musae philologico-sacri antwerpiensis." Of this series he lived to finish only thirteen Sacred books, which were published, in seventeen volumes, from 1744 to 1767. The work was continued by his collaborator and former pupil, Peter van Hove.

In 1765, Smits was appointed the first prefect of the "Musaeum philologico-sacrum", a Franciscan biblical institute at Antwerp.

References

Attribution
 This source cites:
DIRKS, Histoire litteraire et bibliographique des Freres Mineurs (Antwerp, 1885), 318 sqq.
SCHOUTENS, Geschiedenis van het voormatlig Minderbroederklaster van Antwerpen (Antwerp, 1908), 169-99;
HOLZAPFEL, Handbuch der Geschichte des Franziskanerordens (Freiburg, 1909), 565, 595.

1704 births
1770 deaths
Flemish Friars Minor
Dutch biblical scholars
People from Kleve (district)